"Sabre Dance" is a movement in the final act of Aram Khachaturian's ballet Gayane (1942), where the dancers display their skill with sabres. It is Khachaturian's best known and most recognizable work worldwide.

It is notable for its employment of percussion instruments, especially the xylophone. Its middle section is based on an unnamed Armenian folk song. According to Tigran Mansurian, it is a synthesis of an Armenian wedding dance tune from Gyumri tied in a saxophone counterpoint "that seems to come straight from America."

"Sabre Dance" is considered one of the signature pieces of 20th-century popular music. It was popularized by covers by pop artists, first in the US in 1948 and later elsewhere. Its use in a wide range in films and television over the decades have significantly contributed to its renown. "Sabre Dance" has also been used by a number of figure skaters from at least five countries in their performances.

Popularity
NPR described it as "one of the catchiest, most familiar—perhaps most maddening—tunes to come out of the 20th century." Steven Poole notes that the "insistent xylophone-accented melody" of the Sabre Dance has "become a kind of global musical shorthand for cartoonish urgency." Critics Peter G. Davis and Martin Bernheimer have called it "infamous" and "obnoxious," while David Mermelstein called it "garish and ubiquitous." New York Times noted that Khachaturian "never disowned the 'Sabre Dance', but he did feel, apparently, that it deflected attention from his other works." He told an American interviewer, "It's like one button on my shirt, and I have many buttons."

Classical performances and recordings

After World War II, records of dances from Khachaturian's ballet Gayane reached the west and the "Sabre Dance" "caused an immediate sensation and straight away becoming a popular classical hit." In 1948, three records of the "Sabre Dance" reached number one in the Billboard Best-Selling Records by Classical Artists: by the Chicago Symphony Orchestra (conducted by Artur Rodziński), by the New York Philharmonic (conducted by Efrem Kurtz), and by the pianist Oscar Levant (Columbia Records). These records made them one of the Billboard Year's Top Selling Classical Artists. A record by the Boston Pops Orchestra also made it to the classical chart. It became the first million-selling record of the Chicago Symphony Orchestra.

According to the Current Biography Yearbook, it was Levant's performance that "received popular attention." Levant published a piano solo version of it and played the piece five times on Kraft Music Hall between December 1947 and December 1948. He also played it on the piano in the 1949 film The Barkleys of Broadway.

"Sabre Dance" was also recorded by Russian-American violinist Jascha Heifetz (1948, transcribed it for violin/piano), Indianapolis Symphony Orchestra (conducted by Fabien Sevitzky, in 1953), the Hungarian-French pianist György Cziffra (1956), the Royal Philharmonic Orchestra (conducted by Yuri Temirkanov, 1986), the London Symphony Orchestra (conducted by Stanley Black, 1989), the Irish flute player James Galway (1993 album Dances for Flute), the Bolshoi Symphony Orchestra (conducted by Alexander Lazarev, 1994), the National Symphony Orchestra (conducted by Loris Tjeknavorian, 2005), Franco-Serbian violinist Nemanja Radulović (2014).

Covers

US hit (1948)
In 1948 the "Sabre Dance" was recorded by a number of singers and became a jukebox hit in the United States. Newsweek suggested that 1948 could be called "Khachaturian Year in the United States." In February 1948, Billboard wrote that "There's a rash of sabre dance disks based on the familiar excerpts from Aram Khachaturian's Gay[a]ne Ballet Suite." Life Magazine noted that when the Communist Party denounced the Soviet Union's top composers for "formalism", Khachaturian "could only gnaw his nails in despair, waiting for the [Central] Committee to find out that his 'Sabre Dance,' now called 'Sabre Dance Boogie,' is a hit in the hopelessly decadent jukeboxes in the hopelessly bourgeois U.S.A."

By May 1948, three records of Sabre Dance—a pop-boogie hit by Freddy Martin, a dance-band version by Woody Herman, and a vocal version by The Andrews Sisters with harmonica backing—made it to Billboard's Most-Played Juke Box Records at No. 8, No. 13, and No. 28, respectively. Aside from these three versions, it was also recorded by Victor Young's orchestra (Decca Records), Ray Bloch's orchestra (Signature Records), Macklin Marrow's orchestra (MGM), pianist Oscar Levant (Columbia Records), the Angie Bond Trio (Dick Records), and the Harmonickings (Jubilee Records). According to John Sforza "Sabre Dance" is a "good example of multiple recordings of the same song in the 1940s recording industry."

Two decades later, in 1968, when Khachaturian visited the US, New York Post music critic Harriett Johnson noted that "Sabre Dance" is Khachaturian's "most popular piece in this country." New York Times critic Harold C. Schonberg agreed, calling it "enormously popular" and adding that the "little whirling piece occupies the same place in his output that the C sharp minor Prelude did in Rachmaninoff's."

Later versions
Liberace played it live on television. It was released in the 2002 album Legendary Liberace: Musical Highlights of the PBS Special.
An electric guitar version by Dave Edmunds' band Love Sculpture reached No. 5 in the UK Singles Chart in December 1968. It also reached No. 6 in Switzerland, No. 20 in the Netherlands, and No. 28 in West Germany.
The Dutch rock band Ekseption covered it in their debut album Ekseption in 1969.
James Last covered it in his 1972 album Russland zwischen Tag und Nacht.
Spontaneous Combustion released a 1973 single with two versions: "Sabre Dance" produced by the band, and their alternative arrangement "And Now For Something Completely Different! - Sabre Dance" produced by Robert Fripp, Esq., with Fripp on guitar.
The Pretenders, a British–American rock band, performed a cover live at the Marquee Club, London in 1979, which was later included in the 2006 reissue of their eponymous debut album.
The English punk rock band The Boys covered it in their 1979 album To Hell with the Boys.
Ivan Rebroff covered it in a 1982 concert in Sydney.
The song "The Lord's Prayer" in German punk rock singer Nina Hagen's 1985 Nina Hagen in Ekstasy album features an interpolation of the "Sabre Dance".
The English punk rock band U.K. Subs covered it in their 1988 album U.K. Subs.
The English punk rock band Toy Dolls covered it in their 1989 album Wakey Wakey.
Third track on 1994 single "Didn't Know I Had It" by Cheap Trick. 
It is heavily sampled in "Sodom and Gomorrah" by the German heavy metal band Accept, from their 1994 album Death Row. 
"Šavlový tanec" in the 1995 album Šlágry by the Czech metal band Master's Hammer.
The British heavy metal Skyclad covered it in their 1996 album Irrational Anthems.
A cover by Vanessa-Mae appeared in her 2004 album Choreography. 
It is sampled in the Bond song "Highly Strung" from their 2004 album Classified.
American rock musician Tony Levin covered it in his 2006 album Resonator.

In popular culture
The "Sabre Dance" has been used in numerous films, animated films, television series, video games, and commercials over the years, oftentimes for humorous effects. The piece's popular familiarity has been enhanced by its traditional use as accompaniment by travelling circuses and on television variety shows such as The Ed Sullivan Show when novelty acts such as plate spinners appeared.

On June 6, 2013, on the 110th anniversary of Khachaturian's birthday a modern take of the Sabre Dance—Sabre Dance on the Street—was performed at Yerevan Cascade by the Barekamutyun dance ensemble and Armenian Philharmonic Orchestra.

Films and series
Films in which the "Sabre Dance" was used include The Barkleys of Broadway (1949), One, Two, Three (1961), The System (1964), The Seven Brides of Lance-Corporal Zbruyev (1970), Amarcord (1973), Well, Just You Wait! 6th episode "Countryside" (1973), Pee-wee's Big Adventure (1985), Jumpin' Jack Flash (1986), Repentance (1987), Punchline (1988), Hocus Pocus (1993), Radioland Murders (1994), The Hudsucker Proxy (1994), Don't Drink the Water (1994), I Married a Strange Person! (1997), Vegas Vacation (1997), A Simple Wish (1997), Blues Brothers 2000 (1998), The Lion King 1½ (2004), Kung Fu Hustle (2005), Scoop (2006), Sicko (2007), Ghost Town (2008), Witless Protection (2008), Le Concert (2009), Pájaros de papel (2010), Sabre Dance (2015).  In his frenzied comedy One, Two, Three, director Billy Wilder used the dance repeatedly for comic effect, including a crazed chase through East Berlin, and the chaotic closing ride to the airport featuring James Cagney and Horst Buchholz. It was also played briefly in Madagascar 3: Europe's Most Wanted. A band plays the song in the beginning of the movie Hotel Transylvania: Transformania (2022).

Some notable television shows that have used it include The Jack Benny Program (1961), "A Piano in the House" from The Twilight Zone (1962), The Onedin Line (1971 and 1972), The Benny Hill Show (1985), Our Very First Telethon episode of Full House (1990), The Simpsons (1991), The Nanny (1996), Two and a Half Men (2004), "Recipe for Disaster" from What's New, Scooby-Doo? (2004), "Peterotica" episode of Family Guy (2006), SpongeBob SquarePants (2007), and The Big Bang Theory (2009). The song was featured in The Amazing Race 28, when teams travelled to Armenia and had to search the Yerevan Opera Theater for their next clue.

Video games
Video games in which the "Sabre Dance" was used include:
Road Runner (the 1985 Atari System 1 arcade version).
Sleeping Dogs on the classical Boosey and Hawkes radio station.
Final Fantasy IV, as background music for the dancing girls' routines.
Aero the Acro-Bat, as the music in the very first stage (Sega Genesis version), or possibly the 'invulnerability' theme in other versions.
StepManiaX, as a remixed version of it by MonstDeath.

In sports
The National Hockey League (NHL)'s Buffalo Sabres have used the piece as a theme song since the team was established in 1970. After a hiatus, the "Sabre Dance" was again made their theme song in 2011.

In 2010–13, the "Sabre Dance" was played at Donbass Arena, the venue of the Ukrainian football club Shakhtar Donetsk, whenever the Armenian football player Henrikh Mkhitaryan scored a goal.

The "Sabre Dance" was featured in the 2014 Winter Olympics opening ceremony held in Fisht Olympic Stadium, Sochi, Russia on February 7.

Figure skating
The "Sabre Dance" has been used by numerous figure skaters, including:

References
Notes

Citations

Compositions by Aram Khachaturian
Ballets by Aram Khachaturian
Buffalo Sabres
1942 compositions
Soviet songs